The archaeological park of Sabucina (officially, Sabbucina), located on the mountain of the same name near Caltanissetta (8 km to the north east), is an archaeological site in Sicily. The area contains settlements ranging from the Bronze Age (20th-16th century BC) to the Roman period.

Today the site is accessible as the regional archaeological park of Sabucina.

History 

The ancient city had pre-Greek origins; it was constructed by the Sicans, who took advantage of the dominant position of the mountain over the Salso river valley.

Archaeological evidence allows the phases of habitation to be divided as follows:
23rd-15th century BC: some villages of the Castelluccio culture
13th-10th century BC: village of huts of the northern Pantalica culture (threephases)
10th-9th century BC: slight habitation by the Cassibile culture
8th-7th century BC: new settlement with rectangular houses and an organised religious area
6th-4th century BC: settlement of Greek colonists from Gela.

Greek period 

The first phase of the Greek settlement came in the 7th century. The centre consisted of rectangular habitations, with more space between them towards the summit of the mountain. In the 6th century BC, the city wall was built, which probably contained the entire inhabited area at that time. In the 5th century the settlement was destroyed, probably by Ducetius, who is mentioned by Diodorus Siculus. 

Reconstruction occurred in the second half of the 5th century; the settlement received a new layout of streets and housing plots on a different orientation, and a new city wall with rectangular towers. 

This settlement was abandoned in turn in 310 BC, probably by Agathocles of Syracuse.

Roman period

In Roman times, farms and villas were settled in the plain near Piano della Clesia and near the necropolis in the Lannari district.

The bust of emperor Geta was found here dated to 204-5 AD. It was probably produced in Rome and brought to Sicily by aristocratic owners of the villa. It is one of the few official busts of Geta that survive, as after his murder by his brother Caracalla in 212, his memory was obliterated under damnatio.

The land was probably owned from 350 AD by Philippianus judging from tile stamps from the villa of Piano della Clesia, as part of a latifundium farming estate which included the nearby Villa of Geraci.

Archaeological area 

In the area at the bottom of the mountain are some Bronze Age ; other important discoveries include to a hut used as a shrine and the so-called , a terracotta model dating to the 6th century BC, found in the area of the necropolis, which depicts a small temple with a pronaos in antis and a pitched roof surmounted by two figures of cavalrymen and two gorgoneion masks decorating the tympanum. The sacello, with other discoveries, is now kept in the Regional archaeological museum of Caltanissetta.

Starting from the 1960s Piero Orlandini excavated the late Bronze Age huts, dating to the 13th-10th centuries BC. This was an important excavation, since Sabucina was the first village of this type to be identified in Sicily.

References

Bibliography

External links 
 
 

Archaeological sites in the province of Caltanissetta
Archaeological sites in Sicily